Sverre Berglie (21 October 1910 – 21 August 1985) was a Norwegian footballer who played as a forward for the Norway national football team.

He was also capped once in bandy.

Career statistics

International

International goals
Scores and results list Norway's goal tally first.

References

1910 births
1985 deaths
sportspeople from Drammen
Norwegian footballers
Norway international footballers
Association football forwards
Norwegian bandy players
20th-century Norwegian people